The 1974–75 DDR-Oberliga season was the 27th season of the DDR-Oberliga, the top level of ice hockey in East Germany. Two teams participated in the league, and SG Dynamo Weißwasser won the championship.

Game results

Dynamo Weißwasser won series 7:5 in points.

References

External links
East German results 1970-1990

DDR-Oberliga (ice hockey) seasons
Ober
Ger
1974 in East German sport
1975 in East German sport